() is a municipality and village in Frýdek-Místek District in the Moravian-Silesian Region of the Czech Republic. It has about 1,500 inhabitants. It lies in the historical region of Cieszyn Silesia. The folk architecture in the village is well preserved and is protected by law as a village monument zone.

Polish minority makes up 13.8% of the population.

Etymology
Lhotka is a diminutive form of Lhota, which is a common name for villages in both Czech Republic and Western Poland. The word refers to the medieval custom of village founders being exempt from paying duties to their lords for a period of 5–8 years. Komorní Lhotka was first mentioned as Buczkowa Lhota, meaning "Buczek's Lhota". Later the attribute was replaced or dropped and eventually in the 19th century it became known as Komorní (Polish: Kameralna and German Cammeral) as it was belonging to Teschener Kammer.

Geography
Komorní Lhotka lies on the Stonávka River. About three quarters of the municipality lies in the Moravian-Silesian Beskids, the northern part of the municipality lies in the Moravian-Silesian Foothills.

History

The first written mention of Komorní Lhotka is from 1455. Politically the village belonged initially to the Duchy of Teschen. In the second half of the 17th century, the village was colonizes by Vlachs. The livelihood of the population was agriculture (especially flax growing) and pastoralism. in the 19th century, agriculture gradually disappeared. A railway was introduced into the municipality. Residents began working in the surrounding towns, especially in steelworks and mines.

After issuing the Patent of Toleration in 1781 the local citizens subsequently organized a local Lutheran parish as one of over ten in the region.

After Revolutions of 1848 in the Austrian Empire a modern municipal division was introduced in the re-established Austrian Silesia. The village as a municipality was subscribed to the political and legal district of Cieszyn. According to the censuses conducted in 1880–1910 the population of the municipality dropped from 1,164 in 1880 to 1,038 in 1910 with a majority being native Polish-speakers (99.2–100%) accompanied by a small German-speaking minority (at most 12 or 1.3% in 1880). In terms of religion in 1910 the majority were Protestants (88.2%), followed by Roman Catholics (11.2%) and Jews (3 people).

After World War I, Polish–Czechoslovak War and the division of Cieszyn Silesia in 1920, it became a part of Czechoslovakia. Following the Munich Agreement, in October 1938 together with the Zaolzie region it was annexed by Poland, administratively adjoined to Cieszyn County of Silesian Voivodeship. It was then annexed by Nazi Germany at the beginning of World War II. After the war it was restored to Czechoslovakia.

Economy
Since 1860 Kamenná Lhotka has been known for its minor spa, using herbal baths for treating problems with back and cervical vertebrae.

Sights
There are two church buildings in the municipality. The Lutheran church was built in 1782. The Catholic Church of the Divine Heart of the Lord was built in 1885 for summer visitors.

References

External links

 

Villages in Frýdek-Místek District
Cieszyn Silesia